Gasht Rural District or Gosht Rural District may refer to:
 Gasht Rural District (Gilan Province)
 Gosht Rural District (Sistan and Baluchestan Province)